Rodolphus (sometimes Robert) Holland Duell (December 20, 1824 – February 11, 1891) was an American lawyer and politician from New York.

Life
Duell was born in Warren, Herkimer County, New York. He completed preparatory studies and subsequently studied law. He was admitted to the bar in 1845 and commenced practice in Fabius. He married Mary L. Cuyler (1822–1894), and they had two children: Louise C. Duell (1848–1872) and Judge Charles Holland Duell (1850–1920).

Duell moved to Cortland in 1847, and was district attorney of Cortland County from 1850 to 1855. He was Judge of Cortland County from 1855 to 1859.

Duell was elected as a Republican to the 36th and 37th United States Congresses, holding office from March 4, 1859, to March 3, 1863; during the 37th Congress, he was Chairman of the Committee on Revolutionary Claims. He resumed the practice of law in Cortland and was Assessor of Internal Revenue for the 23rd District of New York from 1869 to 1871.

He was elected to the 42nd and 43rd United States Congresses, holding office from March 4, 1871, to March 3, 1875. During the 43rd Congress he was Chairman of the Committee on Expenditures on Public Buildings. Duell was appointed as United States Commissioner of Patents by President Ulysses S. Grant on October 1, 1875, and remained in office until January 30, 1877. He resumed the practice of law in Cortland, where he died in 1891; interment was in Cortland Rural Cemetery.

Sources
 
 Sackett family

External links

 

1824 births
1891 deaths
People from Herkimer County, New York
New York (state) state court judges
County district attorneys in New York (state)
People from Cortland, New York
Republican Party members of the United States House of Representatives from New York (state)
19th-century American politicians
19th-century American judges